Jin Kemu (1912–2000) is a Chinese poet, scholar, translator and essay writer, professor of Beijing University.

In 1935 he started to write poems and novels. In his early years he had different careers as a librarian, newspaper editor and English teacher. In 1941 he went to India, studied ancient Indian literature, Buddhism, philosophy and returned China in 1946. At the time he was one of few scholars in China who knew Sanskrit and Pali language.

In 1946, the Department of Oriental Languages and Literature was established in Beijing University. Jin kemu joined in 1948, he and Ji Xianlin together contributed in developing the Department of Oriental Languages and Literature.

He has translated some ancient India literature and philosophy works into Chinese.
In his old age he continued to write essays which are considered among the finest essays in contemporary China.

References

External links
 

1912 births
2000 deaths
Republic of China poets
People's Republic of China poets
Academic staff of Peking University
Chinese Indologists
People from Lu'an
Poets from Anhui
Republic of China essayists
People's Republic of China essayists
Educators from Anhui
Republic of China translators
People's Republic of China translators
20th-century Chinese translators
20th-century poets
20th-century essayists